Sug Woo Shin is a professor of mathematics at the University of California, Berkeley working in number theory, automorphic forms, and the Langlands program.

Education
From 1994 to 1996 when he was in Seoul Science High School, Shin won two gold medals (including a perfect score in 1995) and one bronze medal while representing South Korea at the International Mathematical Olympiad.
He graduated from Seoul National University with a Bachelor of Science degree in Mathematics in 2000. He received his PhD in mathematics from Harvard University in 2007 under the supervision of Richard Taylor.

Career
Shin was a member of the Institute for Advanced Study from 2007 to 2008, a Dickson Instructor at the University of Chicago from 2008 to 2010, and again a member at the Institute for Advanced Study from 2010 to 2011. He was an assistant professor of mathematics at the Massachusetts Institute of Technology from 2011 to 2014. In 2014, Shin moved to the Department of Mathematics at the University of California, Berkeley as an associate professor. In 2020, Shin became a full professor of mathematics at the University of California, Berkeley.

Shin is a visiting KIAS scholar at the Korea Institute for Advanced Study and a visiting associate member of the Pohang Mathematics Institute.

Research
In 2011, Michael Harris and Shin resolved the dependencies on improved forms of the Arthur–Selberg trace formula in the conditional proofs of generalizations of the Sato–Tate conjecture by Harris (for products of non-isogenous elliptic curves) and Barnet-Lamb–Geraghty–Harris–Taylor (for arbitrary non-CM holomorphic modular forms of weight greater than or equal to two).

Awards
Shin received a Sloan Fellowship in 2013.

Selected publications

References

External links
 

20th-century   South Korean  mathematicians
21st-century  South Korean  mathematicians
Number theorists
Living people
Date of birth missing (living people)
Place of birth missing (living people)
University of California, Berkeley faculty
Harvard University alumni
Seoul National University alumni
Massachusetts Institute of Technology School of Science faculty
University of Chicago faculty
Sloan Research Fellows
Year of birth missing (living people)
International Mathematical Olympiad participants